The 1866 Vermont gubernatorial election took place on September 4, 1866. In keeping with the "Mountain Rule", Incumbent Republican Paul Dillingham was a candidate for a second one-year term as governor of Vermont. With the election taking place soon after the American Civil War, Dillingham ran as a pro-Union Republican. The Democratic nomination was won by Charles N. Davenport of Wilmington, an attorney and founder of the Brattleboro Reformer newspaper, who was also the Democratic nominee in 1865. In the general election, Dillingham was easily elected to a second one-year term as governor.

Results

References

Vermont
1866
Gubernatorial
September 1866 events